The 2016 Men's World Junior Team Squash Championships was held in Bielsko-Biała, Poland. The event took place from 12 to 17 August 2016.

Seeds

Group stage

Pool A

Pool B

Pool C

Pool D

Pool E

Pool F

Knockout stage

Bracket

Semi-finals

Final

Final standing

See also
2016 Men's World Junior Squash Championships
World Junior Squash Championships

References

External links 
World Junior Squash Championships 2016 Official Website
2016 SquashInfo Page

M
Squash tournaments in Poland
2016 in Polish sport
World Junior Squash Championships
International sports competitions hosted by Poland